Locust Hill Country Club is a championship golf club located in the Towns of Henrietta and Pittsford, New York, suburbs six miles (10 km) southeast of downtown Rochester.

Golf course
The club was founded in 1925 as a nine-hole golf course on the  Locust Hill farm of Frank Zornow in the Town of Henrietta, bordering the Town of Pittsford.

In 1927, members purchased the  Brei Farm on the south side of Jefferson Road in Pittsford, and it reopened as an 18-hole course in 1931, redesigned by golf course architect Robert Trent Jones.

This par 72 (35, 37) course is one of the country's top courses, along with Rochester's Oak Hill Country Club, and Country Club of Rochester. The course rating is 72.8 with a slope rating of 138.

In 1966, a charity event was held at LHCC in which RDGA members played with stars such as Arnold Palmer and Jack Nicklaus. Nicklaus drove the green on a  par 4 and two-putted for birdie, while Palmer holed out for eagle on the  eighth hole. Both stated their love for the course after their rounds.

LPGA
From 1977 to 2009, Locust Hill CC was the host of the annual Wegmans LPGA tournament, one of the most popular annual events on the LPGA Tour. The tournament was formerly known as the Bankers Trust Classic (1977–78), Sarah Coventry (1979–81), Rochester International (1982–97), Wegmans Rochester International (1998–2001) and Wegmans Rochester LPGA (2002–05). Locust Hill was the site of Nancy Lopez's fifth consecutive LPGA tournament victory in 1978, a record-setting performance.

From 2010 to 2013, it hosted the LPGA Championship in June, one of the four major championships. The 2010 title was won by Cristie Kerr at 269 (−19), a dozen strokes ahead of the field. In 2011, Yani Tseng won by ten strokes, again at 269 (–19). With longer rough in 2012, Shanshan Feng won her first event on tour by two strokes with a 282 (–6). Top-ranked Inbee Park won in 2013, in a sudden-death playoff over Catriona Matthew. The event moved a few miles east to nearby Monroe Golf Club in 2014.

Scorecard

References

External links
 
 Wegmans LPGA Championship
 Cornell Athletics – Robert Trent Jones

Golf clubs and courses in New York (state)
Sports venues in Monroe County, New York
1931 establishments in New York (state)